Hansruedi Müller (born 8 November 1940) is a Swiss bobsledder. He competed in the four-man event at the 1968 Winter Olympics.

References

External links
 

1940 births
Living people
Swiss male bobsledders
Olympic bobsledders of Switzerland
Bobsledders at the 1968 Winter Olympics
Sportspeople from Koblenz